Thomas Saunders may refer to:

Politicians
Thomas Saunders (MP for Devon), English MP for Devon, 1653–1659
Thomas Saunders (MP for Coventry), English MP for Coventry
Thomas Saunders (died 1565) (1513–1565), English MP for Gatton, Reigate and Surrey
Thomas Saunders (born 1593), English MP for Buckinghamshire
Thomas Saunders (born 1626) (1626–1670), English MP for Wallingford
Thomas Saunders (born 1641), English MP for Milborne Port
Thomas E. Saunders (born 1951), member of the Indiana House of Representatives

Others
Thomas Saunders (colonel), co-author of the Petition of the three colonels of 1654
Thomas Saunders (governor) (1713–1775), British governor of Madras from 1750 till 1755
Thomas Harry Saunders (1813–1870), known as T. H. Saunders, British paper-maker known especially for his watermarks
Thomas William Saunders (1814–1890), British metropolitan police magistrate
Thomas Saunders (academic), Vice-Chancellor of Oxford University
Tom Saunders (1921–2001), football coach
Thomas A. Saunders III (born 1937), American investment banker and philanthropist